David Raven may refer to:

David Raven (actor), English actor
David Raven (footballer) (born 1985), English football player
David Raven, American drummer with The Swirling Eddies